Mary Lee may refer to:

Lady Mary Chudleigh (1656–1710), née Lee, English writer and poet 
Mary Lee (actress) (1924–1996), big band singer and B movie actress 
Mary Lee (singer) (1921–2022), Scottish singer
Mary Lee (suffragette) (1821–1909), social reformer in South Australia
Mary Ann Lee (1824-1899), American ballerina
Mary Anna Custis Lee (1807–1873), American general's wife
Mary Custis Lee (1835—1918), American heiress
Mary Greenhow Lee (1819–1907), American diarist
Mary Isabella Lee (1871–1939), New Zealand servant, dressmaker, coalminer and homemaker
Mary Paik Lee (1900–1995), Korean American writer
Mary Soon Lee (born 1965), British speculative fiction writer and poet
Mary Digges Lee (1745–1805), American patriot
Mary Esther Lee, birth name of Mary von Waldersee
Mary Slingsby (died 1693), English actress, after first marriage known as Mary Lee
Mary Lee (1846–1908), children's writer

See also

Mary Lee Cagle (1864–1955), pastor, in the Church of the Nazarene
Mary Lee Chan (1915–2002), civic activist in Vancouver, British Columbia, Canada
Mary Lee Clark (1835–1923), philanthropist and wife of banker Frederick Ferris Thompson
Mary Lee Fitzhugh Custis (1788–1853), Episcopal lay leader in Virginia
Mary Lee Jensvold, Associate Director of the Chimpanzee and Human Communication Institute 
Mary Lee Kortes, New York-based band led by Michigan-born singer-songwriter Mary Lee Kortes
Mary Leigh Blek, California gun control activist